Heat intolerance is a symptom characterized by feeling overheated in warm environments or when the surrounding environment's temperature rises.  Typically, the person feels uncomfortably hot and sweats excessively.

Compared to heat illnesses like heatstroke, heat intolerance is usually a symptom of endocrine disorders, drugs, or other medical conditions, rather than the result of too much exercise or hot, humid weather.

Symptoms
 Feeling subjectively hot
 Sweating, which may be excessive

In patients with multiple sclerosis (MS), heat intolerance may cause a pseudoexacerbation, which is a temporary worsening of MS-related symptoms.
A temporary worsening of symptoms can also happen in patients with postural orthostatic tachycardia syndrome (POTS) and dysautonomia.

Diagnosis
Diagnosis is largely made from the patient history, followed by blood tests and other medical tests to determine the underlying cause.  In women, hot flashes must be excluded.

Causes
Excess thyroid hormone, which is called thyrotoxicosis (such as in cases of hyperthyroidism), is the most common cause.

Other causes include:
 Amphetamines along with other types of stimulant medications, such as appetite suppressants
 Anticholinergics and other drugs that can impair sweating
 Caffeine
 Malignant hyperthermia susceptibility
 Menopause
 Multiple sclerosis
 Fibromyalgia
 Diabetes
 Hypothalamic tumors
 Methadone treatment
 Dysautonomia
 Postural orthostatic tachycardia syndrome (POTS)
 Sensory defensiveness/sensory processing disorder
 Serotonin syndrome

Treatment
Treatment is directed at making the affected person feel more comfortable, and, if possible, resolving the underlying cause of the heat intolerance.

Symptoms can be reduced by staying in a cool environment.  Drinking more fluids, especially if the person is sweating excessively, may help.

Cooling vests can be used as a preventative tool to reduce a person's body temperature or when symptoms present to feel more comfortable.

References

Symptoms and signs
Sensitivities